= Ray Story =

American founder and CEO of the United Tobacco Vapor Group

- Born: 1964 (age 61–62); United States
- Occupation: Businessman
- Known for: Advocating for vapeing and founder/CEO of UTVG and founder/CEO of TVECA

Ray Story (born in 1964) is an American businessman who is the founder and owner of The United Tobacco Vapor Group (UTVG) USA as well as UTVG Europe BV, both electronic cigarette companies.

He is also the creator of Flavor Vapes, Premium Vapes, Vape Master Cigar, Wanna Vape, and E-Hitter, all of which are brands under the UTVG name. The company's vaping products are sold worldwide online and in store.

== Career ==
In 2008, Ray founded an Electronic Cigarette company called Smoking Everywhere. As owner of Smoking Everywhere, Ray initiated the litigation against the United States FDA claiming the e-cigarette was indeed a tobacco product and not a drug delivery device. On December 7, 2010, Ray and the E-Cigarette industry won a unanimous court decision siding with the industry position.

He created of a new patented vaporization technology for the E-Cigarette called "qmos" which moved away from the traditional heating methods of first generation vaporizers and e-cigarettes in favor of a wick-less and coil-less technology for longevity and consistency.

Ray later founded and became the CEO of The Tobacco Vapor Electronic Cigarette Association (TVECA), a trade association dedicated to advocating for electronic cigarette market by providing the media, legislative bodies, and consumers with education, communication, and research.

He successfully defended the position of the e-cigarette as an alternative tobacco product as opposed to a drug delivery device in the United States in 2009 and defended from the Dutch government in their attempts to ban the e-cigarette in 2012. Ray alongside the TVECA is currently working to duplicate this process in other parts of the world where there exists highly prohibitive or restrictive laws pertaining to the e-cigarette.
